Fahisha or Fahash is an Arabic word, commonly means lewdness and indecency.

Terminology
According to Islamic scholars, there are two opinions about the meaning of Fahisha: 
Either it is fornication and adultery (Zina as Fahisha Mubin), as Quran states,

The second opinion is any bad deeds that deserves punishment such as stoning, killing, cutting a hand, etc. 
The major sins included in Fahisha are numerous. Islamic law considers as a major sin any act that the religion has warned Muslims against performing, or has promised harsh punishment for committing, or has prescribed a Hadd for it. Examples of major sins are disbelieving in Allah (God in Islam) after having believed in Him, killing an innocent soul, dealing with Riba (usury, interest), treating one's parents harshly, adultery, fornication, giving false testimonies, etc.

References

Arabic words and phrases in Sharia
Islamic terminology
Sharia legal terminology